The Under2 Coalition is a coalition of subnational governments that aims to achieve greenhouse gases emissions mitigation. It started as a memorandum of understanding, which was signed by twelve founding jurisdictions on May 19, 2015 in Sacramento, California. Although it was originally called the Under2 MOU, it became known as the Under2 Coalition in 2017. As of October 2022, the list of signatories had grown to 270 governments which represented over 1.75 billion people and 50% of the world economy.  The Under2 MOU was conceived through a partnership between the governments of California and Baden-Wurttemberg, with The Climate Group acting as secretariat.

Purpose and intent
The intent of the memorandum signatories is for each to achieve Greenhouse gas "emission reductions consistent with a trajectory of 80 to 95 percent below 1990 levels by 2050 and/or achieving a per capita annual emission goal of less than 2 metric tons by 2050. The signatories believe these actions are consistent with findings of the Intergovernmental Panel on Climate Change (IPCC) of what is necessary to avoid a 2 degree Celsius rise in average global temperatures. Organizers are concerned that a rise in global temperature above 2 degrees Celsius would cause widespread environmental harm.

Signatories to the memorandum are asked to submit a plan to meet the target reduction of green house gas emissions by 2 metric tons per capita by 2050. Each of the governments also pledges to assist each other with scientific research, sharing of the available technologies and best practices in energy efficiency.

The memorandum was developed just before the 2015 United Nations Climate Change Conference also known as COP 21 or Paris Agreement. The Under2 MOU allows subnational governments such as cities, counties and states to highlight their work to reduce greenhouse gas emissions.

History
Subnational governments like cities, states and provinces have traditionally relied on national governments to take the lead on transnational climate governance aimed at addressing climate change mitigation through inter-governmental agreements. Some subnational governments have expressed frustration at the inaction of national leaders and took it upon themselves to create the subnational Under2 MOU agreement.[1] The major difference between an international treaty and the Under2 MOU agreement between subnational governments is that the Under2 MOU is non-binding.[2]

In December 2015, California and Baden-Wurttemberg, who spearheaded the Under 2 MOU, announced that The Climate Group would take on the role of secretariat for the pact.

There have been efforts in the past to organize subnational governments to address climate change most notably through the Cities for Climate Protection Program - an effort associated with the International Union of Local Authorities and the United Nations Environment Programme. At its peak in 2010 the program had 700 municipal members who were required to provide among other things inventories and targets for greenhouse emissions. the International Union of Local Authorities provided technical assistance to the municipalities engaged in this planning.

Before the Under2 MOU was conceived many subnational governments had taken the initiative to create a climate action plan.  The purpose of a climate action plan is to identify the amount of greenhouse gas emissions produced by the jurisdiction and, in many cases, provide strategies to lower or stop greenhouse gas emissions altogether.  Some governments have found that the data produced by the climate action plan increases transparency and helps with longterm planning to reduce greenhouse gas emissions. Since signatories to the Under2 MOU submit their action plans as an appendix to the document this is the first time some cities and states around the world are coming up with plans to reduce greenhouse gas emissions in their jurisdiction.

Participants

National Endorsements
Armenia, Canada, Chile, Costa Rica, Czech Republic, Denmark, Fiji, France, Germany, Italy, Japan, Luxembourg, Marshall Islands, Mexico, The Netherlands, Norway, Panama, Peru, Portugal, Spain, Sweden, United Kingdom

See also
United States Climate Alliance
Mayors National Climate Action Agenda
The Climate Group
Powering Past Coal Alliance
C40 Cities Climate Leadership Group

References

Climate change treaties
Emissions reduction
September 2015 events in Europe
Events in California
2015 in international relations
September 2015 events in North America